Golchevskaya is a rural locality (a village) in Ilezskoye Rural Settlement, Tarnogsky District, Vologda Oblast, Russia. The population was 27 as of 2002.

Geography 
Golchevskaya is located 34 km northeast of Tarnogsky Gorodok (the district's administrative centre) by road. Gribovskaya is the nearest rural locality.

References 

Rural localities in Tarnogsky District